Tas-Yuryakh (Taas Ürex) is a rural locality (a selo), the only inhabited locality, and the administrative center of Botuobuyinsky Rural Okrug of Mirninsky District in the Sakha Republic, Russia, located  from Suntar, the administrative center of the district. Its population as of the 2010 Census was 480, down from 566 recorded during the 2002 Census.

References

Notes

Sources
Official website of the Sakha Republic. Registry of the Administrative-Territorial Divisions of the Sakha Republic. Mirninsky District. 

Rural localities in Mirninsky District